Thayilla Pillai is 1961 Indian Tamil-language drama film directed and co-produced by L. V. Prasad and written by M. Karunanidhi from a story by S. R. Pinisetty. The film stars T. S. Balaiah and M. V. Rajamma, with G. Muthukrishnan, Kalyan Kumar, S. Rama Rao, Manohar, L. Vijayalakshmi, Madhuri Roy, Sandhya and T. P. Muthulakshmi in supporting roles. It revolves around a mother torn between her love for her orthodox Brahmin husband and her son.

Thayilla Pillai speaks against the caste system in India. It was co-produced by A. Anand, photographed by K. S. Prasad, and edited by A. Sanjeevi. The film was released on 18 August 1961 and became a commercial success, running for over 100 days in theatres. It was remade in Malayalam as Pravaham (1975).

Plot 

The conservative Brahmin Pathanjali Sasthri severs relations with his modern brother-in-law Bharathi, a doctor. When Sasthri's wife Parvathi, who had two miscarriages, finds herself pregnant, she goes to her brother to get medical aid and incurs the displeasure of her husband. The wife gives birth to a son but simultaneously adopts the son of a lower-caste woman who died in childbirth, creating some confusion for Sasthri as to which baby is his son. Eventually the couple raise the adopted child while their biological son becomes a rickshaw-puller. The two boys grow up and become friends. In the end, the family reunites.

Cast 

Male cast
 T. S. Balaiah as Pathanjali Sasthri
 G. Muthukrishnan as Shankar
 Kalyan Kumar as Somu
 S. Rama Rao as Rangu
 Manohar as Doctor Bharathi
Nagesh as Mohan

 Dhakshinamoorthi
 Rajamohan
 C. V. V. Panthulu as Gurumoorthi Pillai
Senthamarai as Ponnan -->

Female cast
 M. V. Rajamma as Parvathi
 L. Vijayalakshmi as Suguna
 Madhuri Roy as Chandra
 Sandhya as Sushila
 T. P. Muthulakshmi as Gangamma

Production 
Thayilla Pillai was directed by L. V. Prasad and produced by A. Anand under Prasad Movies. Although Prasad was the co-producer, he was not listed as such in the opening credits. The screenplay was written by M. Karunanidhi, based on a story by S. R. Pinisetty. Cinematography was handled by K. S. Prasad, art direction by Thotta, and the editing by A. Sanjeevi.

Themes 
Like many films Karunanidhi wrote, Thayilla Pillai reflects his political ideology. It speaks against the caste system in India, and the problem of "orphan children". Karunanidhi said that, through the character of Pathanjali Sasthri, he portrayed "how casteist feelings, age-old customs and rituals and superstitious beliefs had been deeply entrenched in the human psyche for generations."

Soundtrack 
The soundtrack was composed by K. V. Mahadevan and the lyrics were written by Kannadasan, Kothamangalam Subbu and A. Maruthakasi. The songs "Chinna Chinna Ooraniyam", "Kaalam Maruthu Karuthu Maruthu" and "Kadavulum Naanum Oru Jaathi" attained popularity.

Release and reception 

Thayilla Pillai was released on 18 August 1961, and distributed by Gemini Studios. The Indian Express applauded the film, particularly Balaiah's performance, saying he "outshines all others in the cast". The reviewer also praised Rama Rao and Muthulakshmi for providing "good comic relief", and director Prasad for being able to "blend comedy and emotion so well". The film was commercially successful, running for over 100 days in theatres, and became a milestone for "touch[ing] on caste" in that period. It was later remade in Malayalam as Pravaham (1975).

References

Bibliography

External links 
 

1960s satirical films
1960s Tamil-language films
1961 drama films
1961 films
Films about social issues in India
Films about the caste system in India
Films directed by L. V. Prasad
Films scored by K. V. Mahadevan
Films with screenplays by M. Karunanidhi
Indian black-and-white films
Indian drama films
Indian satirical films
Tamil films remade in other languages